Mulraj Rajda (13 November 1931 – 23 September 2012) was an Indian writer, actor and director who predominantly worked in Hindi and Gujarati films, television shows and theatre. He is regarded as one of the most finest artist in the Gujarati cinema. He has appeared in over 50 films, television serials in Gujarati cinema and in Hindi Cinema as an actor, writer, and director, in a career that has spanned over five decades.

After directing many Gujarati theatre plays and television serials,he directed a Gujarati film in (1979) Koinu Mindhal Koina Hathe which was quite successful. The film featured Vikram Gokhale and Rajni Bala.

He is known for writing Aaj Ki Taaza Khabar (1973), Mitti Aur Sona (1989),  Jai Shakumbhari Maa (2000), Jai Shri Swaminarayan (2002). 
The first one helped him to earn him a nomination in Best Story in the prestigious Filmfare Awards in 1974.

Apart from writing and directing, he was quite active as an actor in films, theatre and television serials some of his works are Jesal Toral (1971), Nagin Aur Suhagin (1979), Aman Laxmi (1980),  Ramayan (1987),  Mahabharat (1989), Vishwamitra (1989), Dil Hi Toh Hai (1992),  Byomkesh Bakshi (1993), Krantiveer (1994), Lahoo Ke Do Rang (1997), Mrityudaata (1997), Boond (2001) and Rit Rivaj (2009).

Early life
Mulraj was born on 13 November 1931 in a Gujarati family living in Kalbadevi, Mumbai. After the graduation, Mulraj started working in the Cable Corporation of India and Dena Bank for 2 years.

He started his career in the entertainment field in 1959 when he wrote and acted in a Gujarati play.

Personal life
Mulraj Rajda married actress Indumati on 2 March 1956 and the couple are blessed with 3 children. Indumati has acted in many JD Majethia shows like Khichdi (2002 TV series) (2002), Instant Khichdi (2004) and in Sarabhai VS Sarabhai (2004). She also starred in Indra Kumar directed Mann (film) (1999). This is the one and only Hindi film she has been part of, though she has a huge body of work in Gujarati films. One of their children is also an actor named Sameer Rajda who has worked with his father in Vikram Aur Betaal, Ramayan, Mahabharat etc.

Career

Start in Gujarati industry
Mulraj Rajda spent much of his career working in Gujarati cinema and Theater. After being active in Gujarati theatre for more than 15 years, he joined Gujarati film industry as a writer and actor. Over the years he has continued to write, act and direct Gujarati TV shows, plays and films. Some of his Gujarati TV serials are – Naari Tu Na Haari, Chal Mhare Sathe, O Zindagi, Surajmukhi, etc.

Acting in television serials
He is most well known for portraying Janak in Ramanand Sagar's television series Ramayan. Before this, he played various roles in Sagar's other works, including Vikram aur Betaal. He also has portrayed Vashishtha in the television series Vishwamitra. He is the father of fellow actor and Ramayan co-star Sameer Rajda. He also played the role of Kailash Chandra in the episode Bhoot for Byomkesh Bakshi (TV series), broadcast iy Doordarshan in 1993. He also acted as King Shantanu's royal guru as well as a gandharva mukhiya in B.R. Chopra's Mahabharat.

Writer in Hindi industry
He wrote the story of Aaj Ki Taaza Khabar in 1973 for which he was nominated in the prestigious Filmfare Awards in the category of Best Story Writing in 1974. Then in 1989, Pheka Pheki a Marathi Language film was made which was the remake of Aaj Ki Taaza Khabar (1973). Then again in 2008, Rohit Shetty made Golmaal Returns which was the remake of Pheka Pheki (1989).

He wrote the screenplay of Mitti Aur Sona in (1989) with Debu Sen, directed by Shiv Kumar starring Chunky Pandey, Neelam Kothari, Sonam (actress) , Aruna Irani, Gulshan Grover and Vinod Mehra.

Directing films and television serials
Before entering into directing films and television shows, he has directed many plays in Gujarati theatre. Mulraj first directed Koinu Mindhal Koina Hathe (1979) a Gujarati film starring Vikram Gokhale, Rajni Bala, Arvind Rathod and Snehlata, produced by Sunil Bohra.
In 2002, he wrote and directed the TV series Jai Shri Swaminarayan (2002) produced by Devang Patel.

Partial filmography

Films

As writer

As director

Television

Nominations

Death
Mulraj Rajda died due to age related complications on 23 September 2012 at the age of 80 in Mumbai, Maharashtra. From 2009, Rajda was on a break and preferred to stay home with his family in his last years. In his last years, he was writing for a few films.

See also
 Gujarati film directors

Further reading

References

External links

Indian male television actors
1931 births
2012 deaths